Vernais is a commune in the Cher department in the Centre-Val de Loire region of France.

Geography
The river Auron forms part of the commune’s northern boundary and the Marmande a small part of its southern boundary.

Population

Sights
 The church of Notre-Dame, dating from the twelfth century.

See also
Communes of the Cher department

References

External links

Annuaire Mairie website 

Communes of Cher (department)